This is a list of number-one songs in the United States during the year 1944 according to The Billboard.  Prior to the creation of the Billboard Hot 100, The Billboard published multiple singles charts each week.  In 1944, the following two all-genre national singles charts were published:

National Best Selling Retail Records – ranked the highest-selling singles in retail stores, as reported by merchants surveyed throughout the United States.
Most Played Juke Box Records (introduced January 8) – ranked the most played songs in jukeboxes across the United States, as reported by machine operators.

Shown are the songs that topped the National Best Selling Retail Records and Most Played Juke Box Records charts in 1944.

See also
1944 in music

References

1944
United States singles
1944 in American music